Skin and Bones is a live acoustic album by Foo Fighters released on November 7, 2006.

Background
The 15-track set was recorded on August 29, 30 and 31, 2006 at the Pantages Theatre in Los Angeles and spotlights an expanded eight-piece lineup featuring violinist/singer Petra Haden, former Germs/Nirvana/Foo Fighters guitarist Pat Smear, Wallflowers keyboardist Rami Jaffee, and percussionist Drew Hester. Haden and Jaffee had appeared as guest musicians on the band's previous studio album, In Your Honor. A three-song encore consists of Grohl's solo performances of "Friend of a Friend", "Best of You", and "Everlong". The album debuted at number 21 on the Billboard 200, selling about 49,000 copies in its first week. This was also the album's peak position on the chart.

A DVD of the original shows, featuring a total of 21 songs, was released on November 28, 2006. It was directed by Danny Clinch, who appears briefly on-stage to play harmonica on the song "Another Round", reprising the contribution he made to the original album recording of the song for In Your Honor. The UK version of the release is a two-disc set including the band's 2006 (electric) performance at Hyde Park.

The title song was previously released as a B-side on the single "DOA", and was included on the EP "Five Songs and a Cover".

Track listing

CD

DVD

Live in Los Angeles (USA)

Live in Hyde Park (UK)

Note: The whole setlist is not included on the DVD. The song "The One" is excluded, as Taylor Hawkins made a mistake on the drums; mobile phone footage is available on YouTube. "No Way Back" and "This Is a Call" were on the setlist, but were not played due to strict Royal Park regulations.

Personnel
 Dave Grohl – lead vocals, guitar
 Nate Mendel – bass
 Taylor Hawkins – drums, percussion, backing vocals, lead vocals on "Cold Day in the Sun"
 Chris Shiflett – guitar

Additional musicians

 Petra Haden – violin, mandolin, backing vocals
 Drew Hester – percussion and vibes
 Rami Jaffee – piano, mellotron, accordion, organ
 Pat Smear – acoustic and electric guitar
 Danny Clinch – harmonica on "Another Round"
 Nick Raskulinecz – recording, mixing

Chart positions

Album charts

Live in Hyde Park DVD charts

Certifications

Skin and Bones album and DVD certifications

Live in Hyde Park DVD certifications

References

External links

Foo Fighters live albums
Foo Fighters video albums
Live video albums
2006 live albums
2006 video albums
RCA Records live albums
RCA Records video albums